The 1996 United States presidential election in California took place on November 5, 1996, as part of the 1996 United States presidential election. Voters chose 54 representatives, or electors to the Electoral College, who voted for president and vice president. California, was won by Incumbent President Bill Clinton (D) over Senator Bob Dole (R), with Clinton winning 51.1% to 38.21% by a margin of 12.89%. Billionaire businessman Ross Perot (Reform Party) finished in third, with 6.96% of the popular vote.

California had grown increasingly Democratic relative to the rest of the nation in the prior three elections, culminating in Bill Clinton's becoming the first Democrat to carry California in 1992 since Lyndon Johnson's 1964 landslide. In 1996, Clinton carried California once again by double digits, representing the first time California had voted Democratic in back-to-back elections since 1948. Nevertheless, Clinton's margin of victory shrank from 13.40% to 12.89%, even as his national margin swelled by 3%. Dole reclaimed eleven counties for the GOP: San Diego, Riverside, Fresno, San Luis Obispo, Butte, Tehama, Tuolumne, Siskiyou, Del Norte, Plumas, and Mariposa. He also carried Trinity County, the one county in the state in which Ross Perot had won a plurality in 1992. Of these counties, San Diego, Riverside, Fresno, and San Luis Obispo cast over 100,000 votes; and San Diego County was the largest county in the country to switch parties in 1996.

In contrast, Clinton flipped no counties in the state from red to blue, making this the first election since 1980 in which no red counties in the state turned blue. Clinton became the first Democrat to win the White House without carrying Fresno County since the county's founding in 1856, and remains the only one to have done so as of 2020. He also became the first Democrat since Woodrow Wilson in 1912 to win the White House without carrying Plumas County. Nevertheless, Clinton retained seven counties that he had been the first Democrat to carry since 1964 in 1992: San Bernardino, Ventura, San Joaquin, Santa Barbara, Monterey, Imperial, and San Benito, of which all save Imperial and San Benito cast over 100,000 votes. He also retained all the counties Dukakis had carried in 1988, including a number of sizeable ones that had voted for Ford in 1976, such as Santa Clara, Contra Costa, San Mateo, and Sonoma. This was the last election in which California voted to the right of Arkansas, Michigan, Minnesota, or West Virginia.

Late in the 1996 campaign, Dole had made an upset victory over Clinton in California central to his strategy. Dole hoped to capitalize on two issues that had been figuring prominently in California politics under Governor Pete Wilson, illegal immigration and affirmative action.

California is one of thirteen states where on the election ballot, James Campbell of California, Perot's former boss at IBM, was listed as a stand-in Vice-Presidential candidate.

Results

By county

By congressional district
Clinton won 38 of 52 congressional districts, including eight held by Republicans. Dole won 14 districts, including one held by a Democrat.

References

California
1996
1996 California elections